Pavel Hottmar (born June 28, 1979 in Liberec) is a Czech sprint canoer who competed in the early 2000s. At the 2000 Summer Olympics in Sydney, he was eliminated in the semifinals of both the K-1 500 m and the K-4 1000 m events.

References
 Sports-Reference.com profile

1979 births
Canoeists at the 2000 Summer Olympics
Czech male canoeists
Living people
Olympic canoeists of the Czech Republic
Sportspeople from Liberec